Hybomitra eberi  is a species of horse flies belonging to the family Tabanidae. It is a Palearctic species.

Distribution
France, Italy, Greece, Russia, Central Asia, Iran, Mongolia, China.

References

Tabanidae
Diptera of Asia
Diptera of Europe
Insects described in 1880
Taxa named by Friedrich Moritz Brauer